West Blackdene is a village in County Durham, in England. It is situated to the north of the River Wear, opposite Ireshopeburn. In the 2001 census West Blackdene had a population of 37.

References

Villages in County Durham
Stanhope, County Durham